Agathis, commonly known as kauri or dammara, is a genus of 22 species of evergreen tree. The genus is part of the ancient conifer family Araucariaceae, a group once widespread during the Jurassic and Cretaceous periods, but now largely restricted to the Southern Hemisphere except for a number of extant Malesian Agathis.

Description 

Mature kauri trees have characteristically large trunks, with little or no branching below the crown. In contrast, young trees are normally conical in shape, forming a more rounded or irregularly shaped crown as they achieve maturity.

The bark is smooth and light grey to grey-brown, usually peeling into irregular flakes that become thicker on more mature trees. The branch structure is often horizontal or, when larger, ascending. The lowest branches often leave circular branch scars when they detach from the lower trunk.

The juvenile leaves in all species are larger than the adult, more or less acute, varying among the species from ovate to lanceolate. Adult leaves are opposite, elliptical to linear, very leathery and quite thick. Young leaves are often a coppery-red, contrasting markedly with the usually green or glaucous-green foliage of the previous season.

The male pollen cones appear usually only on larger trees after seed cones have appeared. The female seed cones usually develop on short lateral branchlets, maturing after two years. They are normally oval or globe shaped.

Seeds of some species are attacked by the caterpillars of Agathiphaga, some of the most primitive of all living moths.

Uses 

Various species of kauri give diverse resins such as kauri gum. The timber is generally straight-grained and of fine quality with an exceptional strength-to-weight ratio and rot resistance, making it ideal for yacht hull construction. The wood is commonly used in the manufacture of guitars and ukuleles due to its low density and relatively low price of production. It is also used for some Go boards (goban). The uses of the New Zealand species (A. australis)  included shipbuilding, house construction, wood panelling, furniture making, mine braces, and railway sleepers. Due to the hard resin of the wood, it was the traditionally preferred material used by Māori for wooden weapons, patu aruhe (fernroot beaters) and barkcloth beaters.

Evolutionary history 
Within Araucariaceae, Agathis is more closely related to Wollemia than to Araucaria. The oldest fossils currently confidently assignable to Agathis are those of Agathis immortalis from the Salamanca Formation of Patagonia, which dates to the Paleocene, approximately 64.67–63.49 million years ago. Agathis-like leaves are also known from the slightly older Lefipán Formation of the same region, which date to the very end of the Cretaceous. Other fossils of the genus are known from the Eocene of Patagonia, the Late Paleocene-Miocene of southern Australia, and the Oligocene-Miocene of New Zealand.

Species list 
Accepted species

Formerly included
Moved to Nageia 
 Agathis motleyi - Nageia motleyi  
 Agathis veitchii - Nageia nagi
The placement of the fossil species "Agathis" jurassica from the Late Jurassic of Australia in this genus is doubtful.

Gallery

References

External links 

 Systematics of Agathis (archived copy)
 Gymnosperm Database: Agathis
 Kauri forest in Te Ara: The Encyclopedia of New Zealand
 Threatened Conifers of the World

 
Conifer genera